Les raquetteurs is a 1958 Direct Cinema documentary film co-directed by Michel Brault and Gilles Groulx. The film explores life in rural Quebec, at a convention of snowshoers in Sherbrooke, Quebec in February  1958. The film is notable for helping to establish the then-nascent French language  production unit at the National Film Board of Canada, and  more importantly, the development of a uniquely Quebec style of direct cinema.

The film incorporates agile camera work and a largely synchronous soundtrack, uninterrupted by any narration, in keeping with the ethos of direct cinema to avoid any imposed "truth" on events onscreen.

Production
Grant McLean, then head of production for the NFB, had been angry that what was to have been a three-minute vignette had quadrupled in length and ordered the film to be used for stock footage. However, NFB producers Tom Daly and Guy Glover interceded on the young  filmmakers' behalf.

Release
At the time of its release, Les raquetteurs raised some concerns about its  "nonofficial" style, and ruffled some feathers in Quebec for its portrayal of rural Quebecers.

References

External links
Watch Les Raquetteurs at NFB.ca

1958 films
1950s short documentary films
Black-and-white documentary films
National Film Board of Canada documentaries
1950s French-language films
Films directed by Michel Brault
Films directed by Gilles Groulx
Anthropology documentary films
1958 documentary films
Snowshoeing
Films shot in Quebec
Films set in Quebec
Culture of Sherbrooke
Canadian short documentary films
French-language Canadian films
1950s Canadian films